The first USS High Ball (SP-947) was a United States Navy patrol vessel in commission from 1917 to 1919.

High Ball was built as a private motorboat of the same name in 1910. On 21 May 1917, the U.S. Navy acquired her from her owner, W. J. Green of Utica, New York, for use as a section patrol boat during World War I. She was commissioned at the New York Navy Yard in Brooklyn, New York, as USS High Ball (SP-947) on 1 June 1917.

Assigned to the 3rd Naval District, High Ball served throughout her naval career as ship's tender to the monitor USS Amphitrite (Monitor No. 2) in New York Harbor. For a brief period in late 1918, she was one of two boats named High Ball in U.S. Navy service, the other being .

High Ball was returned to Green on 21 May 1919.

References

SP-947 High Ball at Department of the Navy Naval History and Heritage Command Online Library of Selected Images: U.S. Navy Ships – Listed by Hull Number "SP" #s and "ID" #s – World War I Era Patrol Vessels and other Acquired Ships and Craft numbered from SP-900 through SP-999
NavSource Online: Section Patrol Craft Photo Archive High Ball (SP 947)

Patrol vessels of the United States Navy
World War I patrol vessels of the United States
Auxiliary ships of the United States Navy
World War I auxiliary ships of the United States
1910 ships